Diego Armando Montiel (22 April 1996 – 26 December 2021) was an Argentine professional footballer who played as a midfielder.

Career
Montiel began his career with Argentine Primera División club Atlético de Rafaela, with four years spent with the youth team. His first taste of senior football came on 19 June 2013 when he was an unused substitute for a Copa Argentina tie with San Lorenzo. He made his debut for the club on 24 August 2014 in a league win at La Bombonera versus Boca Juniors. He scored his first goal for Rafaela four matches later in a home league defeat to River Plate. Rafaela were relegated in 2016–17, Montiel subsequently signed a new contract but was immediately loaned to fellow Primera B Nacional side Juventud Unida.

His first appearance for Juventud Unida came on 30 October 2017 versus Aldosivi, coming on for the final five minutes in a 2–0 defeat. Montiel's first Juventud goal came in a league match with Deportivo Morón on 20 November. Montiel terminated his contract with Rafaela in January 2019. Montiel subsequently had a stint in Torneo Regional Federal Amateur with Bragado in 2019, scoring twice across nine fixtures.

Personal life and death
Montiel died from meningitis on 26 December 2021, at the age of 25.

Career statistics

References

External links
 

1996 births
2021 deaths
Sportspeople from Corrientes Province
Argentine footballers
Association football midfielders
Argentine Primera División players
Primera Nacional players
Atlético de Rafaela footballers
Deaths from meningitis 
Infectious disease deaths in Argentina 
Neurological disease deaths in Argentina
Juventud Unida de Gualeguaychú players